The 1988 Virginia Slims Championships was a women's tennis tournament played on indoor carpet courts at Madison Square Garden in New York City, New York in the United States. It was the 17th edition of the year-end singles championships, the 13th edition of the year-end doubles championships, and was part of the 1988 WTA Tour. The tournament ran from November 14 through November 20, 1988.

Having become the only player in history to win the Golden Grand Slam by taking the Australian Open, French Open, Wimbledon and US Open singles titles, along with the Olympic gold medal; Steffi Graf's defeat in the semi finals by Pam Shriver deprived her of the Super Slam and the Super Golden Slam.

Champions

Singles

 Gabriela Sabatini defeated  Pam Shriver, 7–5, 6–2, 6–2.
 It was Sabatini's 6th title of the year and the 18th of her career.

Doubles

 Martina Navratilova /  Pam Shriver defeated  Larisa Savchenko /  Natasha Zvereva, 6–3, 6–4.
 It was Navratilova's 17th title of the year and the 281st overall title of her career. It was Shriver's 11th title of the year and the 114th of her career.

See also
 1988 Nabisco Masters

References

External links
 

WTA Tour Championships
Virginia Slims Championships
Virginia Slims Championships
Virginia Slims Championships
1980s in Manhattan
Virginia Slims Championships
Madison Square Garden
Sports competitions in New York City
Sports in Manhattan
Tennis tournaments in New York City